Jason Jones (born October 17, 1979 in Tallahassee, Florida) is an American country music singer. He is signed to Warner Bros. Records Nashville, and made his chart debut in May 2011 with the single "Ferris Wheel". The song is included on a six-song digital extended play, released on May 31.

Biography
Jones said that he was introduced to country music while driving between Florida and Georgia. He formed a rock band in high school, and later dropped out of Florida State University to move to Nashville, Tennessee to begin his musical career. In Nashville, he joined a band which performed at the Wildhorse Saloon, and signed to a songwriting contract with Warner/Chappell.

Jones was slated to be working with songwriter and producer Brett Beavers on his debut album, which would have been titled Ferris Wheel. The album's title track was released in May 2011, and it entered the Hot Country Songs charts at number 59 for the chart dated June 11, 2011.

Personal life
Jones resides in Tennessee. He is married and he has three sons.

Discography

Extended plays

Singles

Music videos

External links

References

American country singer-songwriters
American male singer-songwriters
Living people
Singer-songwriters from Florida
Warner Records artists
People from Crawfordville, Florida
1994 births
21st-century American singers
Country musicians from Florida
21st-century American male singers